The second USS Abarenda (IX-131) was a storage tanker, one of many miscellaneous-class Navy vessel crewed by the United States Coast Guard during World War II.

Design and construction
Acme was an Emergency Fleet Corporation design 1047 tanker laid down by the Union Iron Works in San Francisco, in 1916, for the United States Shipping Board. She was launched 29 April 1916, and commissioned 22 June 1916.

Acme was designed for transporting oil in bulk to Far Eastern ports that had been served by British ships before the outbreak of World War I. She, along with four more ships that were to follow her, had been designated "A" boats by the Marine Transportation Department.

Service history

World War I
During World War I Acme filled in for British ship that had been commandeered by the British Admiralty. Her first voyage was to China. She would continue her San Francisco to China route for the next five years with only rare trips to New York for loads to Singapore via the Suez Canal. After the United States entered World War I, only Acme and two of her sister ships were available for Standard Transportation to use in the Pacific, this was mainly because on her return trips she would load coconut oil in the Philippines, which because of its 12 percent glycerin content made it a valuable war cargo.

Post war service
Acme started running a route from the "Texas-oil-coast" to "ports-north-of-Hatteras" in 1925. She changed owners in 1931 and 1935, but she didn't change names.

World War II

Eleven of her crew were killed with the surviving 20 abandoning ship. The War Shipping Administration (WSA) requisitioned her about a month later while she was still in dock.

After repairs Acme served in transatlantic convoys, with deliveries of fuel to Guantanamo Bay Naval Base, on occasion.

In September 1943, the WSA obtained full title to Acme when they traded six obsolete tankers for three new tankers.

In anticipation of her acquisition by the Navy, Acme was renamed Abarenda on 3 November 1943 and simultaneously classified IX-131. She was purchased by the Navy on 26 February 1944 and commissioned on 18 April 1944.

Abarenda was assigned to Service Squadron 10 as a floating storage tanker. She served at Manus Island in the Admiralty Islands until 20 February 1945 when she headed for the Philippines. The tanker arrived at Leyte on 13 March and, for the remainder of the War, dispensed fuel to the warships of the 3d/5th Fleet.

Post war and decommissioning
Following the end of World War II, Abarenda fueled the ships supporting the occupation forces in the Far East and continued that duty until 28 February 1946 at which time she was decommissioned in the Philippines. Returned to the WSA that day, she was berthed with that organization's reserve fleet at Subic Bay. Her name was struck from the Navy list on 20 March 1946 and she resumed the name Acme while in the WSA reserve fleet.

Sold on 29 January 1948 to the Asia Development Corp., Shanghai, China, along with 15 other vessels, for scrapping, she was delivered to her purchaser on 3 March 1948.

Notes

References

Books
 
Online sources

External links

World War II tankers of the United States
Mobile storage tankers of the United States Navy
Ships built in San Francisco
1916 ships
Maritime incidents in March 1942
Maritime incidents in November 1944